WYMeditor is an open-source WYSIWYM text editor written in the JavaScript programming language for editing content on web pages. It is based on the jQuery JavaScript framework. It differs from other embeddable text editors such as FCKeditor and TinyMCE in that it concentrates on the semantics and meaning of content leaving out visual details. Unlike WYSIWYG editors, it explicitly shows the XHTML structure of content to the user.

Presentation and visual coherence is added using CSS which is either provided prepackaged, or can be customized.

WYMeditor is web server agnostic meaning it can be integrated into web pages built with any server side language.

Although lacking in some areas, WYMeditor statedly has more readable and cleaner source code. The opposite is often said about its competitors.

References

External links 
 wymeditor.github.com
 WYMeditor web site
 WYMeditor documentation
 
 WYMeditor Drupal module
 WYMeditor extension for Refinery CMS
 WYMeditor Django integration
 WYMeditor on Ohloh

Free HTML editors
Free text editors
JavaScript-based HTML editors
Drupal